A flash cut, also called a flash cutover, is an immediate change in a complex system, with no phase-in period.

In the United States, some telephone area codes were split or overlaid immediately, rather than being phased in with a permissive dialing period. An example is telephone area code 213, which serves downtown Los Angeles and its immediate environs,  split in January 1951 into 213 and 714 all at once. Another example is an immediate switch from an analog television channel to a digital television channel on the same frequency, where the two cannot operate in parallel without interference.

A flash cut can also define a procedure in which multiple components of computer infrastructure are upgraded in multiple ways, all at once, with no phase-in period.

In film, an extremely brief shot, sometimes as short as one frame, which is nearly subliminal in effect. Also a series of short staccato shots that create a rhythmic effect.

See also 
 Big bang adoption
 Flag day (software)
 Dagen H, when Sweden switched from driving on the left-hand side of the road to the right
 Smash cut, an abrupt change of scene in a motion picture

References

External links 
 Letter Report to the FBI (2004), Computer Science and Telecommunications Board (CSTB)
 US Patent 5764754 - Subscriber loop reconnection device and method
  – From AT&T's archives

Telephone numbers
Digital television